Right to Vote was formed in January 2019 as a group of Conservative MPs and peers who advocated holding a second referendum on Brexit. In summer 2019, the group folded.

Right to Vote was founded in the aftermath of the UK government losing the first meaningful vote on its withdrawal agreement with the EU.

Members

Disbanded
In summer 2019, the Right To Vote campaign folded, with the group subsequently deleting their website. Both groups formally disbanded in January 2020.

References

External links 
 

Brexit–related advocacy groups in the United Kingdom